is a former Japanese football player.

Playing career
Seki was born in Ome on June 26, 1972. He joined Yomiuri (later Verdy Kawasaki) from youth team in 1990. However he could not play at all in the match. In 1994, he moved to Japan Football League club Tokyo Gas. He played as regular forward and scored many goals with Amaral. In 1996, he moved to Bellmare Hiratsuka. In June 1998, he returned to Tokyo Gas. In October 1998, he moved to Consadole Sapporo which performance was bad. However the club was relegated to J2 League end of 1998 season. He retired end of 1999 season.

Club statistics

References

External links

jsgoal.jp

1972 births
Living people
Association football people from Tokyo
Japanese footballers
Japan Soccer League players
J1 League players
J2 League players
Japan Football League (1992–1998) players
Tokyo Verdy players
FC Tokyo players
Shonan Bellmare players
Hokkaido Consadole Sapporo players
Association football forwards
People from Ōme, Tokyo